is a passenger railway station  located in the city of Itami, Hyōgo Prefecture, Japan. It is operated by the West Japan Railway Company (JR West)..The station is connected to a large indoor mall to the northwest by a broad pedestrian bridge. Though Hankyu Itami Station is not within easy walking distance, there is also a series of broad pedestrian streets heading in its direction.

Lines

Station layout
The station consists of two side platforms with two tracks slightly below grade level, connected to the station building by a footbridge. There are two depot tracks on the west side of the platform, and the last trains arriving at Takarazuka Station and the rapid trains arriving at some Shin-Sanda Station return here overnight. The station has a Midori no Madoguchi staffed ticket office.

Platforms

Adjacent stations

History
The station opened on 12 December 1893 on the Settsu Railway (which merged into Hankaku Railway in 1897, was nationalized as part of Japanese National Railways in 1907, and was renamed from the Hankaku Line to the Fukuchiyama Line in 1912).

In 1989, JR West announced plans for a new line connecting the station to Itami Airport, but the plan has been on hold since the mid-2000s. Hyogo Prefecture later considered constructing a light rail system to connect the station to the airport.

The station ceased railway operations for 55 days in 2005 following the Amagasaki derailment (which during the day of the accident, the train involved in the accident overshot the platform).

Station numbering was introduced in March 2018 with Itami being assigned station number JR-G52.

Passenger statistics
In fiscal 2016, the station was used by an average of 24,285 passengers daily

Surrounding area
 Aeon Mall Itami
Toyo Tire head office
Itami City Museum of Art

See also
List of railway stations in Japan

References

External links 

 Itami Station from JR-Odekake.net 

Railway stations in Hyōgo Prefecture
Railway stations in Japan opened in 1893
Itami, Hyōgo